The 2013 MTV Video Music Awards were held on August 25, 2013, at the Barclays Center in Brooklyn, New York. Marking the 30th installment of the award show, they were the first to be held in New York City not to use a venue within the borough of Manhattan. Nominations were announced on July 17, 2013. Leading the nominees were Justin Timberlake and Macklemore & Ryan Lewis with six, followed by Bruno Mars, Miley Cyrus, and Robin Thicke with four. Pop singer Justin Timberlake was the big winner on the night with four awards, including Video of the Year for "Mirrors" and the Michael Jackson Vanguard Award. Macklemore & Ryan Lewis, Bruno Mars and Taylor Swift were also among the winners of the night. The ceremony drew a total of 10.1 million viewers.

The show featured Miley Cyrus and Robin Thicke's raunchy and sexually-driven performance for the medley of their songs "We Can't Stop" and "Blurred Lines", which received negative reactions from critics and mixed reactions from fans and fellow celebrities. The most watched performance of the night was Justin Timberlake's 15-minute medley number, which included a brief reunion with NSYNC, leading up to his acceptance speech for the Michael Jackson Video Vanguard Award.

Performances

House artist
 DJ Cassidy

Presenters
List of presenters:
 Sway, Christina Garibaldi, James Montgomery – Pre-Show
 One Direction – presented Best Pop Video
 Shailene Woodley and Vanessa Bayer (as Miley Cyrus) – introduced Miley Cyrus and Robin Thicke
 Iggy Azalea and Lil' Kim – presented Best Hip-Hop Video
 Kevin Hart – speech
 Jared Leto – introduced Kanye West
 Daft Punk, Nile Rodgers and Pharrell Williams – presented Best Female Video
 Ed Sheeran – presented Best Video with a Social Message
 Jimmy Fallon – presented Video Vanguard Award
 Vampire Weekend – presented Best Song of the Summer
 ASAP Rocky and Jason Collins – introduced Macklemore, Ryan Lewis and Mary Lambert
 Emeli Sandé and Adam Lambert – presented Artist to Watch
 TLC (T-Boz and Chilli) – introduced Drake
 Taylor Swift – presented Best Male Video
 Selena Gomez – introduced Bruno Mars
 Joseph Gordon-Levitt – presented Video of the Year
 Allison Williams  – introduced Katy Perry

Winners and nominees
Nominees were announced on July 17, 2013. Winners were announced on August 25, 2013.

Video of the Year
Justin Timberlake – "Mirrors"
 Macklemore and Ryan Lewis (featuring Wanz) – "Thrift Shop"
 Bruno Mars – "Locked Out of Heaven"
 Taylor Swift – "I Knew You Were Trouble"
 Robin Thicke (featuring T.I. and Pharrell) – "Blurred Lines"

Best Male Video
Bruno Mars – "Locked Out of Heaven"
 Kendrick Lamar – "Swimming Pools (Drank)"
 Ed Sheeran – "Lego House"
 Robin Thicke (featuring T.I. and Pharrell) – "Blurred Lines"
 Justin Timberlake – "Mirrors"

Best Female Video
Taylor Swift – "I Knew You Were Trouble"
 Miley Cyrus – "We Can't Stop"
 Demi Lovato – "Heart Attack"
 Pink (featuring Nate Ruess) – "Just Give Me a Reason"
 Rihanna (featuring Mikky Ekko) – "Stay"

Artist to Watch
Austin Mahone – "What About Love"
 Iggy Azalea – "Work"
 Twenty One Pilots – "Holding On to You"
 The Weeknd – "Wicked Games"
 Zedd (featuring Foxes) – "Clarity"

Best Pop Video
Selena Gomez – "Come & Get It"
 Miley Cyrus – "We Can't Stop"
 fun. – "Carry On"
 Bruno Mars – "Locked Out of Heaven"
 Justin Timberlake – "Mirrors"

Best Rock Video
Thirty Seconds to Mars – "Up in the Air"
 Fall Out Boy – "My Songs Know What You Did in the Dark (Light Em Up)"
 Imagine Dragons – "Radioactive"
 Mumford & Sons – "I Will Wait"
 Vampire Weekend – "Diane Young"

Best Hip-Hop Video
Macklemore and Ryan Lewis (featuring Ray Dalton) – "Can't Hold Us"
 A$AP Rocky (featuring 2 Chainz, Drake and Kendrick Lamar) – "Fuckin' Problems"
 J. Cole (featuring Miguel) – "Power Trip"
 Drake – "Started from the Bottom"
 Kendrick Lamar – "Swimming Pools (Drank)"

Best Collaboration
Pink (featuring Nate Ruess) – "Just Give Me a Reason"
 Calvin Harris (featuring Ellie Goulding) – "I Need Your Love"
 Pitbull (featuring Christina Aguilera) – "Feel This Moment"
 Robin Thicke (featuring T.I. and Pharrell) – "Blurred Lines"
 Justin Timberlake (featuring Jay-Z) – "Suit & Tie"

Best Direction
Justin Timberlake (featuring Jay-Z) – "Suit & Tie" (Director: David Fincher)
 Drake – "Started from the Bottom" (Directors: Director X and Drake)
 Fun. – "Carry On" (Director: Anthony Mandler)
 Macklemore and Ryan Lewis (featuring Ray Dalton) – "Can't Hold Us" (Directors: Ryan Lewis, Jason Koenig and Jon Jon Augustavo)
 Yeah Yeah Yeahs – "Sacrilege" (Director: Megaforce)

Best Choreography
Bruno Mars – "Treasure"  (Choreographer: Bruno Mars)
 Chris Brown – "Fine China" (Choreographers: Richmond Talauega, Anthony Talauega and Anwar "Flii" Burton)
 Ciara – "Body Party"  (Choreographer: Jamaica Craft)
 Jennifer Lopez (featuring Pitbull) – "Live It Up"  (Choreographers: J.R. Taylor and Beau Smart)
 will.i.am (featuring Justin Bieber) – "#thatPOWER" (Choreographers: Fatima Robinson and Ryo Noguchi)

Best Visual Effects
Capital Cities – "Safe and Sound" (Visual Effects: Grady Hall, Jonathan Wu and Derek Johnson)
 Duck Sauce – "It's You" (Visual Effects: Royal Post / Paris)
 Flying Lotus – "Tiny Tortures" (Visual Effects: Dustin Bowser)
 Skrillex (featuring The Doors) – "Breakn' a Sweat" (Visual Effects: Bonnie Brae, BEMO, Jeff Dotson and Erik Lee)
 The Weeknd – "Wicked Games" (Visual Effects: Drop and Abel)

Best Art Direction
Janelle Monáe (featuring Erykah Badu) – "Q.U.E.E.N." (Art Director: Veronica Logsdon)
 Alt-J – "Tessellate" (Art Director: Charlie Lambros)
 Capital Cities – "Safe and Sound" (Art Director: Teri Whittaker)
 Lana Del Rey – "National Anthem" (Art Director: Lou Asaro)
 Thirty Seconds to Mars – "Up in the Air" (Art Director: Floyd Albee)

Best Editing
Justin Timberlake – "Mirrors" (Editors: Jarrett Fijal and Bonch LA)
 Miley Cyrus – "We Can't Stop" (Editors: Paul Martinez and Nick Rondeau)
 Calvin Harris (featuring Florence Welch) – "Sweet Nothing" (Editors: Vincent Haycock and Ross Hallard)
 Macklemore and Ryan Lewis (featuring Ray Dalton) – "Can't Hold Us" (Editors: Ryan Lewis and Jason Koenig)
 Pink (featuring Nate Ruess) – "Just Give Me a Reason" (Editor: Jackie London at Sunset Edit)

Best Cinematography
Macklemore and Ryan Lewis (featuring Ray Dalton) – "Can't Hold Us" (Directors of Photography: Jason Koenig, Ryan Lewis and Mego Lin)
 A-Trak and Tommy Trash – "Tuna Melt" (Directors of Photography: TS Pfeffer and Robert McHugh)
 Lana Del Rey – "Ride" (Director of Photography: Malik Sayeed)
 Thirty Seconds to Mars – "Up in the Air" (Director of Photography: David Devlin)
 Yeah Yeah Yeahs – "Sacrilege" (Director of Photography: Alexis Zabé)

Best Video with a Social Message
Macklemore and Ryan Lewis (featuring Mary Lambert) – "Same Love"
 Beyoncé – "I Was Here"
 Kelly Clarkson – "People Like Us"
 Miguel – "Candles in the Sun"
 Snoop Lion (featuring Drake and Cori B.) – "No Guns Allowed"

Best Song of the Summer
One Direction – "Best Song Ever"
 Miley Cyrus – "We Can't Stop"
 Daft Punk (featuring Pharrell Williams) – "Get Lucky"
 Selena Gomez – "Come & Get It"
 Calvin Harris (featuring Ellie Goulding) – "I Need Your Love"
 Robin Thicke (featuring T.I. and Pharrell) – "Blurred Lines"

Best Latino ArtistDaddy Yankee Don Omar
 Jesse & Joy
 Pitbull
 Alejandro Sanz

Michael Jackson Video Vanguard AwardJustin Timberlake' Controversy 
Pop singer Miley Cyrus became the subject of widespread media attention following a controversial performance with Robin Thicke. The performance began with Cyrus performing "We Can't Stop" in bear-themed attire. Following this, Thicke entered the stage and Cyrus stripped down to a flesh-colored two-piece latex outfit while they performed "Blurred Lines" in a duet. Cyrus subsequently touched Thicke's crotch area with a giant manicured foam finger and twerked against him.

Critics broadly panned the performance, while fans and celebrities were shocked. Parents expressed outrage over the performance. An article published in The Hollywood Reporter described the performance as "crass" and "reminiscent of a bad acid trip". The performance was described by XXL critic B. J. Steiner as a "trainwreck in the classic sense of the word as the audience reaction seemed to be a mix of confusion, dismay and horror in a cocktail of embarrassment", while the BBC said Cyrus stole the show with a "raunchy performance". Katy Kroll of Rolling Stone magazine wrote in 2014, "there were dancing teddy bears, an overused foam finger, an unflattering flesh-colored bikini, some very obvious groping and twerking – lots and lots of twerking. For lack of a better term, it was a hot mess." A Telegraph article described Cyrus' actions as her going into "overdrive [...] trying to kill off her Disney millstone, Hannah Montana.

The performance prompted Disney to pull Cyrus' Hannah Montana series from reruns on Disney Channel. Also, Toys "R" Us discontinued all Hannah Montana'' toys from its stores. It generated 306,100 tweets per minute on Twitter, Cyrus' performance resulted in a gain of over 213,000 Twitter followers, 226,000 likes on Facebook, and 90,000 downloads of her new single, "Wrecking Ball", within days of the controversial performance. This amounted to a total 112% increase in Cyrus' social media activity. The performance topped Twitter during the East Coast telecast, with Timberlake behind with 219,800 tweets per minute at its peak. The most-mentioned performers on Twitter were Cyrus (4.5 million), Timberlake (2.9 million) and Lady Gaga (1.9 million).

See also
2013 MTV Europe Music Awards

References

External links
 

2013 controversies
MTV Video Music Awards
MTV Video Music Awards
MTV Video Music Awards
Mass media-related controversies in the United States
Nudity in television
2013
Television controversies in the United States
MTV Video Music